The 2008 Thailand League Division 1 has 16 teams.

Rules

Teams play each other twice on a home and away basis
3 Points for a win
1 Point for a draw
Teams finishing on same points at the end of the season use head-to-head record to determine finishing position.
The top three teams will be promoted to Thailand Premier League
The top team as champions.
The bottom four teams will be relegated to Thailand Division 2 League

Member clubs

Stadiums and locations

Final league standings

Results

Top scorers
Last updated October 6, 2008

Prize money

 Champion      : 700,000 Baht
 Runner-up     : 300,000 Baht
 Third Place   : 200,000 Baht
 Fourth Place  : 100,000 Baht
 Fifth Place   :  50,000 Baht
 Sixth Place   :  40,000 Baht
 Seventh Place :  20,000 Baht

See also
 2008 Thailand Premier League 
 2008 Thailand League Division 2

References

Thailand 2008 RSSSF

External links
 Official website
 Football Association of Thailand

Thai League 2 seasons
2